The 3rd International Emmy Awards took place on November 24, 1975, in New York City. The award ceremony, presented by the International Academy of Television Arts and Sciences, honors all programming produced and originally aired outside the United States.

Ceremony 
The International Emmy Awards are given annually by the International Academy of Television Arts and Sciences. The winners include the British network BBC with two awards, the non-fiction for Marek, a drama that tells the story of a child who undergo an operation on the heart, and that due to a complication called pulmonary atresia, dies. The film talks about the courage of a family in a time of crisis. And the Popular Arts Award for The Evacuees.

During the ceremony, the Academy honored the president of Tokyo Broadcasting System, Junzo Imamichi with 1975 International Emmy Directorate Award.

Winners 
Best Popular Arts Program: The Evacuees (BBC Two)
Best Drama: Marek (BBC Two)
Directorate Award: Junzo Imamichi (President of TBS TV)

External links 
 1975 International Emmy Awards

International Emmy Awards ceremonies
International
International
International Emmy